Stoke Newington was a borough constituency in the parliamentary county of London from 1918 – 1950. It returned one Member of Parliament (MP)  to the House of Commons of the Parliament of the United Kingdom.

Boundaries
The constituency was identical in area to the Metropolitan Borough of Stoke Newington.

History
The seat was created under the Representation of the People Act 1918 for the 1918 general election, and abolished under the Representation of the People Act 1948 for the 1950 general election, and largely replaced by the newly created Hackney North & Stoke Newington constituency.

Members of Parliament

Elections

Elections in the 1910s 

 denotes candidate who was endorsed by the Coalition Government.

Elections in the 1920s

Elections in the 1930s

Elections in the 1940s 
General Election 1939–40:
Another General Election was required to take place before the end of 1940. The political parties had been making preparations for an election to take place from 1939 and by the end of this year, the following candidates had been selected; 
 Conservative: George Jones
 Labour: David Weitzman
 Liberal: Harold Gordon
 British Union: Edward Whinfield

References
 

Parliamentary constituencies in the London Borough of Hackney
Parliamentary constituencies in London (historic)
Constituencies of the Parliament of the United Kingdom established in 1918
Constituencies of the Parliament of the United Kingdom disestablished in 1950
Stoke Newington